N. Soundararajan was an Indian politician and former Member of Parliament. He was elected to the Lok Sabha as an Anna Dravida Munnetra Kazhagam candidate from Sivakasi Lok Sabha constituency in 1980 and 1984 elections.

References 

All India Anna Dravida Munnetra Kazhagam politicians
Living people
India MPs 1980–1984
India MPs 1984–1989
Lok Sabha members from Tamil Nadu
People from Virudhunagar district
Year of birth missing (living people)